Sini (also Romanized as Sīnī) is a village in Khanmirza Rural District, Khanmirza District, Lordegan County, Chaharmahal and Bakhtiari Province, Iran. At the 2006 census, its population was 1,314, in 276 families.

References 

Populated places in Lordegan County